Emmanuel Collard (born 3 April 1971) is a French professional racing driver. He is a former member of the Porsche Junioren factory team, but also drives for other marques.

Born in Arpajon, Essonne, Collard is the winner of the Le Mans Series for Pescarolo Sport in 2005 and 2006 with Jean-Christophe Boullion and in 2011 for Pescarolo Team with Julien Jousse. He co-drove the overall winner of the 2008 12 Hours of Sebring.

Racing record

Complete International Formula 3000 results
(key) (Races in bold indicate pole position) (Races
in italics indicate fastest lap)
{| class="wikitable" style="text-align:center; font-size:90%"
|-
! Year
! Entrant
! 1
! 2
! 3
! 4
! 5
! 6
! 7
! 8
! 9
! 10
! DC
! Points
|-
| 1991
! Apomatox
| VAL
| PAU| JER
| MUG
| PER
| HOC
| BRH
| SPA
|style="background:#EFCFFF;"| BUG
|style="background:#EFCFFF;"| NOG
! NC
! 0
|-
| 1992
! Apomatox
|style="background:#efcfff;"| SIL
|style="background:#efcfff;"| PAU
|style="background:#dfffdf;"| CAT
|style="background:#efcfff;"| PER
|style="background:#efcfff;"| HOC
|style="background:#dfffdf;"| NÜR
|style="background:#FFCFCF;"| SPA
|style="background:#ffdf9f;"| ALB
|style="background:#efcfff;"| NOG
|style="background:#dfffdf;"| MAG
! 8th
! 13
|-
| 1993
! Apomatox
|style="background:#CFCFFF;"| DON
|style="background:#EFCFFF;"| SIL
|style="background:#EFCFFF;"| PAU
|style="background:#CFCFFF;"| PER
|style="background:#EFCFFF;"| HOC
|style="background:#CFCFFF;"| NÜR
|style="background:#CFCFFF;"| SPA
|style="background:#EFCFFF;"| MAG|style="background:#ffdf9f;"| NOG
|
! 12th
! 4
|}

24 Hours of Le Mans results

Complete European Le Mans Series results
(key) (Races in bold' indicate pole position; races in italics'' indicate fastest lap)

Complete FIA World Endurance Championship results

* Season still in progress.

External links

 
 

1971 births
Living people
People from Arpajon
French racing drivers
French Formula Renault 2.0 drivers
FIA GT Championship drivers
International Formula 3000 drivers
24 Hours of Le Mans drivers
24 Hours of Daytona drivers
American Le Mans Series drivers
European Le Mans Series drivers
Rolex Sports Car Series drivers
Porsche Supercup drivers
FIA World Endurance Championship drivers
Blancpain Endurance Series drivers
International GT Open drivers
WeatherTech SportsCar Championship drivers
24 Hours of Spa drivers
12 Hours of Sebring drivers
Sportspeople from Essonne
Team Penske drivers
Karting World Championship drivers
AF Corse drivers
DAMS drivers
Corvette Racing drivers
TDS Racing drivers
20th-century French people
21st-century French people
Larbre Compétition drivers
Toyota Gazoo Racing drivers
Pescarolo Sport drivers
Porsche Motorsports drivers
Cheever Racing drivers
Wayne Taylor Racing drivers
Level 5 Motorsports drivers
La Filière drivers
Nürburgring 24 Hours drivers
24H Series drivers
Le Mans Cup drivers